Gabriele Janke (born 23 February 1956) is a German fencer. She competed in the women's individual and team foil events for East Germany at the 1980 Summer Olympics.

References

1956 births
Living people
German female fencers
Olympic fencers of East Germany
Fencers at the 1980 Summer Olympics
Sportspeople from Magdeburg